A rogue is a person or entity that flouts accepted norms of behavior. 

Rogue or rogues may also refer to:

Companies
 Rogue Ales, a microbrewery in Newport, Oregon
 Rogue Arts, a film production company
 Rogue Entertainment, a software company
 Rogue Films, a production company based in London
 Rogue Fitness, a manufacturer and distributor of strength and conditioning equipment
 Rogue Pictures, an American film production company
 Rogue (esports), an American esports organization

Arts, entertainment and media

Comics
 Rogue (Marvel Comics), a Marvel comics character
 Rogues (comics), a villain team in the DC Comics universe
 Rogue Trooper, a fictional character from the science fiction strip of the same name

Film and television
 The Rogue, a 1918 American film starring Oliver Hardy
 Rogue (2007 film), an Australian independent horror film 
 Rogue (2017 film), an Indian bilingual action thriller
 Rogue (2020 film), an American action film starring Megan Fox
 Rogue (TV series), an American police drama series
 The Rogues (film), a 1987 Italian comedy film ("I picari" in Italian)
 The Rogues (TV series), a 1964–1965 American series
 "Rogue" (The Professionals), a 1978 episode of the crime-action television drama
 "Rogue", an episode of the television series NCIS; see NCIS (season 14)
 "Rogue", an episode of the television series Smallville; see List of Smallville episodes

Gaming
 Rogue (character class) in role-playing games
 Rogue (video game), a 1980 dungeon-crawling video game
 Assassin's Creed Rogue, a 2014 action-adventure video game

Literature
 Rogue (novel), by Danielle Steel, published in 2008
 The Rogue (novel), a 2011 novel by Trudi Canavan
 The Rogues, a series of Forgotten Realms novels
 Rogues (anthology), a 2014 short story collection edited by George R. R. Martin and Gardner Dozois
 Rogue, a 2001 Star Trek: Section 31 novel

Music
 Rogue (band), British pop music and soft rock band
 Rogue (Joel Hunt), music producer with Monstercat
 Rogue (Virgil Roger du Pont III), vocalist with The Crüxshadows
 "Rogues", song on the album Light Grenades by Incubus

Other uses
 Rogue (magazine), a men's magazine
 The Rogue: Searching for the Real Sarah Palin, a 2011 biography by Joe McGinniss

Places
 Rogues, Gard, a town in southern France
 Rogue River (Michigan)
 Rogue River (Oregon)
 Rogue Valley, Oregon
 Rogue Valley AVA, Oregon wine region within the Rogue Valley

Science and technology
 Rogue planet, a planet-sized object not orbiting a parent star
 Rogue security software, malicious software that generates false security warnings
 Rogue wave, a large, unexpected ocean wave
 Moog Rogue, an analog synthesizer from the 1980s
 Nissan Rogue, a car produced by Nissan Motors from 2007
 A variant of the Rambler American, a car made by American Motors (AMC) in the 1960s
 A lone and often destructive elephant

Other uses
 An unlawful vagrant, especially under certain historic Vagrancy Acts in England

See also
 Rogue state, a term for a nation acting outside international norms
 RogueArt, a French independent record label
 Roguing, in agriculture, the act of identifying and removing undesirable plants
 Lovable rogue, a fictional character archetype